RTV Goražde or Televizija BPK (full legal name: RADIO-TELEVIZIJA BOSANSKO PODRINJSKOG KANTONA GORAŽDE) is a public TV channel founded in 1996 by Assembly of Bosnian Podrinje Canton Goražde.

External links 
 Official website

Television stations in Bosnia and Herzegovina
Television channels and stations established in 1996